Shaui Koli Creek is a stream in the U.S. state of Mississippi.

Shaui Koli is a name derived from the Choctaw language meaning "raccoon spring".

References

Rivers of Mississippi
Rivers of Leake County, Mississippi
Mississippi placenames of Native American origin